Cyprinus longzhouensis is a species of ray-finned fish in the genus Cyprinus. It is only known from the upper Zuo River basin in Guangxi, China, but may occur in associated drainages in northern Vietnam.

References

 

Cyprinus
Fish described in 1977